Mount Lazarev (Гора Лазарева, "Gora Lazareva") is a massif on the northern portion of Yuzhny Island, Novaya Zemlya, in Russia. It was used for many Soviet  nuclear tests, starting with the first underground nuclear test on Novaya Zemlya, 18 September 1964, which may have resulted in tired mountain syndrome.

References

Lazarev
Russian nuclear test sites
Novaya Zemlya